Deena Nicole Buckner (née Cortese; born January 12, 1987) is an American reality television personality who appeared on the MTV reality show Jersey Shore from 2010 to 2012 and Jersey Shore: Family Vacation.

Early life 
Cortese was born in the New Egypt section of Plumsted Township, New Jersey to Italian-American parents John (1949–2016) and Joan Cortese. She graduated from New Egypt High School where she did both cheerleading and dance, and briefly attended Brookdale Community College. Joanie Maiorella is Cortese's older sister that had been put up for adoption and lived down the road from them. Deena learned of this when she was 7 and met her sister there after. Joanie was seen in multiple episodes throughout season five of Jersey Shore.

Career 
Cortese was a cast member on the reality TV series Jersey Shore. Deena had originally auditioned for season 1 but had to decline the offer due to a family emergency; however, she was cast by MTV when Angelina Pivarnick left the show after season two, and Snooki suggested her as a replacement. She joined the cast in season three, which filmed in Seaside Heights, New Jersey.

In 2014, Cortese appeared on Couples Therapy.

In 2018, Cortese returned to MTV as one of the cast members of Jersey Shore: Family Vacation.

Personal life 
In November 2016, Cortese became engaged to Christopher Buckner. They were married on October 28, 2017. In 2018, Cortese revealed that she and her husband were expecting their first child, a son. Cortese gave birth to Christopher John "CJ" Buckner on January 5, 2019. They reside in Jackson Township, New Jersey. In October 2020, she revealed that she and her husband were expecting their second child in May 2021 and later revealed to be a boy. Cortese gave birth to Cameron Theo Buckner on May 1, 2021.

Filmography

References

External links 
 

1987 births
American people of Italian descent
Brookdale Community College alumni
Living people
Participants in American reality television series
People from Jackson Township, New Jersey
People from Plumsted Township, New Jersey